George Brewster may refer to:

 Dod Brewster (1891–?), Scottish football centre-half
 George Brewster (sculptor) (1862–1943), American sculptor and architectural sculptor
 George Brewster (1864–1875), whose death led to the Chimney Sweepers Act 1875